The following lists events that will happen during 2011 in Saudi Arabia.

Abdullatif Al Fozan Award is established.

Incumbents
Monarch: Abdullah
Crown Prince:
 until 22 October: Sultan
 22 October-29 October: vacant
 since 29 October: Nayef

References

 
2010s in Saudi Arabia
Saudi Arabia
Saudi Arabia
Years of the 21st century in Saudi Arabia